Transylmania is a 2009 American comedy horror film directed by David and Scott Hillenbrand, and co-written by Patrick Casey and Worm Miller. The film did poorly at the box office, making it one of the biggest flops of 2009.

Synopsis
16th century Romania is terrorized by vampire king Radu, and his lover the evil sorceress Stephenia. Vampire hunter Victor Van Sloan tricks Stephenia into opening an enchanted music box, which sucks in her soul. Escaping out a window into daylight, Van Sloan falls to his death thanks to his moronic son's accidentally moving the hay cart which had been positioned to soften his landing. The music box is washed away in the river, leading Radu to begin a centuries-long search for it.

In the present, several American college students are convinced by their friend Rusty (who bears an uncanny resemblance to Radu) to spend a semester in Romania at Razvan University, which was formerly Radu's castle; his true reason is to meet his computer girlfriend Draguta. At the university, they meet the diminutive dean Floca and self-defense teacher Teodora, Van Sloan's descendant who has been tasked with preventing Radu from getting the music box. Radu returns to the castle that night and begins collecting blood as part of a ceremony to revive Stephenia. Unfortunately, a truly dumb blond now owns the music box and accidentally lets her blood fall on the gem inside it; as a result, Stephenia can now take possession of her body when the music box is open. Rusty learns that Draguta is the dean's hunchback daughter; he is forced into a relationship with Draguta by Floca after finding her previous boyfriend locked in a torture room for simply standing her up. The other students discover that Floca kidnapped girls from the university for experiments to remove their heads for a body swap, to give Draguta a normal body. They take the still-living head of their friend just as Floca returns with Draguta for the procedure.

At the same time, Teodora has mistaken Rusty for Radu, due to the costume he chose for a vampire-themed party that he missed due to accidentally being given drugs that made him woozy. Rusty is accidentally taken by Radu's minions to enact the ritual to revive Stephenia; however, as this would require ripping out the heart of her host, Rusty is forced to shut the music box and listen to his friend's idiotic ramblings of how she thinks aliens are controlling her. Assaulted by her boyfriend, Rusty gives up on trying to help as his friends are too stupid to listen. Rusty spots Radu and pretends to be a reflection through a frame used for pictures to buy time to hide; Teodora ends up finding the wrong one, but is forced to eliminate Radu's minions.

Rusty attempts hiding in the dance hall, but is confronted by Teodora; he attempts reasoning, but she is too stubborn to believe "vampire lies". The real Radu arrives along with Stephenia, causing a stressful back and forth. With Rusty and Radu side-by-side, Teodora and Stephenia realize they were both wrong. Unfortunately, campus security men arrest Teodora, leaving Radu's execution to Cliff, a moron who's been attempting to pick up chicks by pretending to be a vampire hunter, who can't tell the two apart despite the obvious difference in their voices. The crossbow fires accidentally, hitting Radu in the heart and reducing him to ash; Teodora smashes the music box, which causes Stephenia's corpse to dissolve, and free her host.

A time skip reveals Cliff became a Razvan professor, printing a fabrication about how Radu was defeated. He also explains the fates of his friends, while some have great careers, other are not so fortunate. In the case of Rusty, though he is now married to the attractive Draguta, their child is highly deformed despite her different body (it has dean Floca's pointed hair, goatee, and Draguta's hump). Dean Floca was also arrested for his crimes. As for Teodora, she moved to America as there was no longer anything to hunt in Romania; she became a cop, but has trouble telling deformed people apart from actual monsters.

Cast

Release
The film premiered at American Film Market in November 2008, and was screened at the European Film Market in February 2009. Unlike the straight-to-DVD release of National Lampoon's Dorm Daze 2, the film had a theatrical release on December 4, 2009 opening in 1,007 theaters. The DVD was released on April 27, 2010 by Sony Pictures Home Entertainment.

Production
The movie was entirely shot in Romania, Corvin Castle in 2007 and the Vgp Effects & Design was created by Vincent Guastini.

Reception

Critical
, the film holds a 0% approval rating on review aggregator website Rotten Tomatoes, based on 22 reviews with an average rating of 2.23/10. The website's critics consensus reads: "Never aiming higher than threadbare jokes and offensive attempts at politically incorrect humor, Transylmania is a vampire comedy that truly sucks." Review aggregator Metacritic scored the film 8 out of 100 based on 10 reviews, indicating "Overwhelming dislike."

Tom Russo for The Boston Globe called it "woefully dim-witted." Steven Hyden for The A.V. Club called it "such a colossal comedic misfire that it makes the execrable Scary Movie films look like masterworks of Preston Sturges-esque genius by comparison." Frank Scheck for The Hollywood Reporter called it a "lame vampire spoof" that "has no bite." Adam Markovitz for Entertainment Weekly called it "a no-stars, no-plot, no-point vampire spoof about a group of coeds studying abroad in a haunted castle, Transylmania boasts the kind of acting and direction usually relegated to the adult section of your local video store." Mike Hale of The New York Times wrote that Transylmania is "destined to spend a short and painful life in theaters and then join the ranks of the DVD and late-night-cable undead." Robert Able of the Los Angeles Times wrote that "if your idea of a good time is laughing with repulsion at a humpbacked Romanian nympho with a torture-loving midget dad, or tittering every time a bong appears, a darkened theater awaits you." Brian Orndorf said that "I surveyed the crowd at the screening I attended, feeling the chill in the air as seven strangers sat in stone-cold silence -- not a single laugh from anyone. The eighth moviegoer? Fast asleep five minutes in. I've never envied a person more."

Box office
The film was a major box office disaster and had an extremely poor opening, at #21 with only $263,941 from 1,007 theaters, making it the 3rd worst movie opening since 1982 for films which opened in more than 600 theaters, and the worst ever at the time for films opening in over 1,000 theaters.

2012 lawsuit
David and Scott Hillenbrand were sued by their Transylmania financial backers for financial recovery in 2012. Kim Swartz, an attorney at Mitchell Silberberg representing the Hillenbrands, says in response, "This is a completely meritless lawsuit. The plaintiffs saw the finished film numerous times before they chose to invest. In any event, David and Scott Hillenbrand and their team of top professionals did everything they could to try to get their investors a return on their investment, even to the Hillenbrands' own financial detriment, and, as stated in the Complaint, in spite of the plaintiffs' failure to provide the agreed upon P&A funds in a timely manner. The Hillenbrands look forward to having the plaintiffs' completely meritless claims dismissed and to prosecuting their own claims."

In August, 2012, the Hillenbrands’ production company, Hill & Brand Productions 7 LLC, counter-sued Third Eye Capital Corporation and Strative Capital LTD for fraud and breach of contract seeking damages of no less than $107,000,000.00 and alleging a scheme to defraud Hill & Brand Productions 7 LLC, and to exploit the name and reputation of the Hillenbrands for their own financial gain.

See also
Vampire film

References

External links
 
 

National Lampoon films
2009 films
2009 comedy horror films
2000s parody films
2000s teen comedy films
2000s teen horror films
American comedy horror films
American parody films
American teen comedy films
American teen horror films
2000s English-language films
Films set in the 16th century
Films set in Romania
Films shot in Romania
Films with screenplays by Josh Miller (filmmaker)
Films with screenplays by Patrick Casey (writer)
Parodies of horror
Vampire comedy films
2000s American films